Ari-Pekka Heikkinen (born 8 April 1957) is a Finnish footballer who competed in the men's tournament at the 1980 Summer Olympics.

References

External links
 

1957 births
Living people
Finnish footballers
Finland international footballers
Olympic footballers of Finland
Footballers at the 1980 Summer Olympics
People from Kuopio
Association football defenders
Sportspeople from North Savo
Kuopion Palloseura players
Oulun Palloseura players
Koparit players